This is a list of seasons completed by the Toronto Raptors National Basketball Association (NBA) franchise. Because of the global COVID-19 pandemic and the attendant restrictions on travel and activity in the Ontario province in Canada, the Raptors played the entire 2020-21 season away from Toronto, with their "home" games taking place in Tampa, Florida. They are the only franchise not based in the United States to win the NBA title (in 2019).

Table key

Seasons

Notes
  Lockout-shortened season (50 games)
  Lockout-shortened season (66 games)
  Season suspended mid-season due to the global COVID-19 pandemic (72 games)
  Start of season delayed due to the global COVID-19 pandemic (72 games)

All-time records

References

External links
Toronto Raptors at Basketball Reference

 
seasons